Watershed High School is a charter school located in the city of Richfield, Minnesota.

References 

Schools in Hennepin County, Minnesota
Charter schools in Minnesota